This is a list of electoral division results for the Australian 1966 federal election.

Overall
This section is an excerpt from 1966 Australian federal election § Results

New South Wales

Banks 
This section is an excerpt from Electoral results for the Division of Banks § 1966

Barton 
This section is an excerpt from Electoral results for the Division of Barton § 1966

Bennelong 
This section is an excerpt from Electoral results for the Division of Bennelong § 1966

Blaxland 
This section is an excerpt from Electoral results for the Division of Blaxland § 1966

Bradfield 
This section is an excerpt from Electoral results for the Division of Bradfield § 1966

Calare 
This section is an excerpt from Electoral results for the Division of Calare § 1966

Cowper 
This section is an excerpt from Electoral results for the Division of Cowper § 1966

Cunningham 
This section is an excerpt from Electoral results for the Division of Cunningham § 1966

Dalley 
This section is an excerpt from Electoral results for the Division of Dalley § 1966

Darling 
This section is an excerpt from Electoral results for the Division of Darling § 1966

East Sydney 
This section is an excerpt from Electoral results for the Division of East Sydney § 1966

Eden-Monaro 
This section is an excerpt from Electoral results for the Division of Eden-Monaro § 1966

Evans 
This section is an excerpt from Electoral results for the Division of Evans § 1966

Farrer 
This section is an excerpt from Electoral results for the Division of Farrer § 1966

Grayndler 
This section is an excerpt from Electoral results for the Division of Grayndler § 1966

Gwydir 
This section is an excerpt from Electoral results for the Division of Gwydir § 1966

Hughes 
This section is an excerpt from Electoral results for the Division of Hughes § 1966

Hume 
This section is an excerpt from Electoral results for the Division of Hume § 1966

Hunter 
This section is an excerpt from Electoral results for the Division of Hunter § 1966

Kingsford Smith 
This section is an excerpt from Electoral results for the Division of Kingsford Smith § 1966

Lang 
This section is an excerpt from Electoral results for the Division of Lang § 1966

Lawson 
This section is an excerpt from Electoral results for the Division of Lawson § 1966

Lowe 
This section is an excerpt from Electoral results for the Division of Lowe § 1966

Lyne 
This section is an excerpt from Electoral results for the Division of Lyne § 1966

Macarthur 
This section is an excerpt from Electoral results for the Division of Macarthur § 1966

Mackellar 
This section is an excerpt from Electoral results for the Division of Mackellar § 1966

Macquarie 
This section is an excerpt from Electoral results for the Division of Macquarie § 1966

Mitchell 
This section is an excerpt from Electoral results for the Division of Mitchell § 1966

New England 
This section is an excerpt from Electoral results for the Division of New England § 1966

Newcastle 
This section is an excerpt from Electoral results for the Division of Newcastle1966

North Sydney 
This section is an excerpt from Electoral results for the Division of North Sydney § 1966

Parkes 
This section is an excerpt from Electoral results for the Division of Parkes (1901–1969) § 1966

Parramatta 
This section is an excerpt from Electoral results for the Division of Parramatta § 1966

Paterson 
This section is an excerpt from Electoral results for the Division of Paterson § 1966

Phillip 
This section is an excerpt from Electoral results for the Division of Phillip § 1966

Reid
This section is an excerpt from Electoral results for the Division of Reid § 1966

Richmond 
This section is an excerpt from Electoral results for the Division of Richmond § 1966

Riverina 
This section is an excerpt from Electoral results for the Division of Riverina § 1966

Robertson 
This section is an excerpt from Electoral results for the Division of Robertson § 1966

Shortland 
This section is an excerpt from Electoral results for the Division of Shortland § 1966

St George 
This section is an excerpt from Electoral results for the Division of St George § 1966

Warringah 
This section is an excerpt from Electoral results for the Division of Warringah § 1966

Watson 
This section is an excerpt from Electoral results for the Division of Watson (1934–1969) § 1966

Wentworth 
This section is an excerpt from Electoral results for the Division of Wentworth § 1966

Werriwa 
This section is an excerpt from Electoral results for the Division of Werriwa § 1966

West Sydney 
This section is an excerpt from Electoral results for the Division of West Sydney § 1966

Victoria

Balaclava 
This section is an excerpt from Electoral results for the Division of Balaclava § 1966

Ballaarat 
This section is an excerpt from Electoral results for the Division of Ballarat § 1966

Batman 
This section is an excerpt from Electoral results for the Division of Batman § 1966

Bendigo 
This section is an excerpt from Electoral results for the Division of Bendigo § 1966

Bruce 
This section is an excerpt from Electoral results for the Division of Bruce § 1966

Chisholm 
This section is an excerpt from Electoral results for the Division of Chisholm § 1966

Corangamite 
This section is an excerpt from Electoral results for the Division of Corangamite § 1966

Corio 
This section is an excerpt from Electoral results for the Division of Corio § 1966

Darebin 
This section is an excerpt from Electoral results for the Division of Darebin § 1966

Deakin 
This section is an excerpt from Electoral results for the Division of Deakin § 1966

Fawkner 
This section is an excerpt from Electoral results for the Division of Fawkner § 1966

Flinders 
This section is an excerpt from Electoral results for the Division of Flinders § 1966

Gellibrand 
This section is an excerpt from Electoral results for the Division of Gellibrand § 1966

Gippsland 
This section is an excerpt from Electoral results for the Division of Gippsland § 1966

Henty 
This section is an excerpt from Electoral results for the Division of Henty § 1966

Higgins 
This section is an excerpt from Electoral results for the Division of Higgins § 1966

Higinbotham 
This section is an excerpt from Electoral results for the Division of Higinbotham § 1966

Indi 
This section is an excerpt from Electoral results for the Division of Indi § 1966

Isaacs 
This section is an excerpt from Electoral results for the Division of Isaacs (1949–1969) § 1966

Kooyong 
This section is an excerpt from Electoral results for the Division of Kooyong § 1966

La Trobe 
This section is an excerpt from Electoral results for the Division of La Trobe § 1966

Lalor 
This section is an excerpt from Electoral results for the Division of Lalor § 1966

Mallee 
This section is an excerpt from Electoral results for the Division of Mallee § 1966

Maribyrnong 
This section is an excerpt from Electoral results for the Division of Maribyrnong § 1966

McMillan 
This section is an excerpt from Electoral results for the Division of McMillan § 1966

Melbourne 
This section is an excerpt from Electoral results for the Division of Melbourne § 1966

Melbourne Ports 
This section is an excerpt from Electoral results for the Division of Melbourne Ports § 1966

Murray 
This section is an excerpt from Electoral results for the Division of Murray § 1966

Scullin 
This section is an excerpt from Electoral results for the Division of Scullin (1955–69) § 1966

Wannon 
This section is an excerpt from Electoral results for the Division of Wannon § 1966

Wills 
This section is an excerpt from Electoral results for the Division of Wills § 1966

Wimmera 
This section is an excerpt from Electoral results for the Division of Wimmera § 1966

Yarra 
This section is an excerpt from Electoral results for the Division of Yarra § 1966

Queensland

Bowman 
This section is an excerpt from Electoral results for the Division of Bowman § 1966

Brisbane 
This section is an excerpt from Electoral results for the Division of Brisbane § 1966

Capricornia 
This section is an excerpt from Electoral results for the Division of Capricornia § 1966

Darling Downs 
This section is an excerpt from Electoral results for the Division of Darling Downs § 1966

Dawson 
This section is an excerpt from Electoral results for the Division of Dawson § 1966

Fisher 
This section is an excerpt from Electoral results for the Division of Fisher § 1966

Griffith 
This section is an excerpt from Electoral results for the Division of Griffith § 1966

Herbert 
This section is an excerpt from Electoral results for the Division of Herbert § 1966

Kennedy 
This section is an excerpt from Electoral results for the Division of Kennedy § 1966

Leichhardt 
This section is an excerpt from Electoral results for the Division of Leichhardt § 1966

Lilley 
This section is an excerpt from Electoral results for the Division of Lilley § 1966

Maranoa 
This section is an excerpt from Electoral results for the Division of Maranoa § 1966

McPherson 
This section is an excerpt from Electoral results for the Division of McPherson § 1966

Moreton 
This section is an excerpt from Electoral results for the Division of Moreton § 1966

Oxley 
This section is an excerpt from Electoral results for the Division of Oxley § 1966

Petrie 
This section is an excerpt from Electoral results for the Division of Petrie § 1966

Ryan 
This section is an excerpt from Electoral results for the Division of Ryan § 1966

Wide Bay 
This section is an excerpt from Electoral results for the Division of Wide Bay § 1966

South Australia

Adelaide 
This section is an excerpt from Electoral results for the Division of Adelaide § 1966

Angas 
This section is an excerpt from Electoral results for the Division of Angas (1949–1977) § 1949

Barker 
This section is an excerpt from Electoral results for the Division of Barker § 1966

Bonython 
This section is an excerpt from Electoral results for the Division of Bonython § 1966

Boothby 
This section is an excerpt from Electoral results for the Division of Boothby § 1966

Grey 
This section is an excerpt from Electoral results for the Division of Grey § 1966

Hindmarsh 
This section is an excerpt from Electoral results for the Division of Hindmarsh § 1966

Kingston 
This section is an excerpt from Electoral results for the Division of Kingston § 1966

Port Adelaide 
This section is an excerpt from Electoral results for the Division of Port Adelaide § 1966

Sturt 
This section is an excerpt from Electoral results for the Division of Sturt § 1966

Wakefield 
This section is an excerpt from Electoral results for the Division of Wakefield § 1966

Western Australia

Canning 
This section is an excerpt from Electoral results for the Division of Canning § 1966

Curtin 
This section is an excerpt from Electoral results for the Division of Curtin § 1966

Forrest 
This section is an excerpt from Electoral results for the Division of Forrest § 1966

Fremantle 
This section is an excerpt from Electoral results for the Division of Fremantle § 1966

Kalgoorlie 
This section is an excerpt from Electoral results for the Division of Kalgoorlie § 1966

Moore 
This section is an excerpt from Electoral results for the Division of Moore § 1966

Perth 
This section is an excerpt from Electoral results for the Division of Perth § 1966

Stirling 
This section is an excerpt from Electoral results for the Division of Stirling § 1966

Swan 
This section is an excerpt from Electoral results for the Division of Swan § 1966

Tasmania

Bass 
This section is an excerpt from Electoral results for the Division of Bass § 1966

Braddon 
This section is an excerpt from Electoral results for the Division of Braddon § 1966

Denison 
This section is an excerpt from Electoral results for the Division of Denison § 1966

Franklin 
This section is an excerpt from Electoral results for the Division of Franklin § 1966

Wilmot 
This section is an excerpt from Electoral results for the Division of Wilmot § 1966

Territories

Australian Capital Territory 

This section is an excerpt from Electoral results for the Division of Australian Capital Territory § 1966

Northern Territory 

This section is an excerpt from Electoral results for the Division of Northern Territory § 1966

See also 

 Candidates of the 1966 Australian federal election
 1966 Australian Senate election
 1967 Australian Senate election
 Members of the Australian House of Representatives, 1966–1969
 Members of the Australian Senate, 1965–1968
 Members of the Australian Senate, 1968–1971

References 

House of Representatives 1966